The non-marine molluscs of Somalia are a part of the molluscan fauna of Somalia (wildlife of Somalia).

A number of species of non-marine molluscs are found in the wild in Somalia.

Freshwater gastropods 
Freshwater gastropods in Somalia include:

Planorbidae
 Bulinus abyssinicus (von Martens, 1866)

Lymnaeidae
 Radix natalensis (Krauss, 1848)

Land gastropods 
Land gastropods in Somalia include:

Streptaxidae
 Somalitayloria Verdcourt, 1962 - endemic genus

Freshwater bivalves
Freshwater bivalves in Somalia include:

See also
 List of marine molluscs of Somalia

Lists of molluscs of surrounding countries:
 List of non-marine molluscs of Djibouti, Wildlife of Djibouti
 List of non-marine molluscs of Kenya, Wildlife of Kenya
 List of non-marine molluscs of Yemen, Wildlife of Yemen
 List of non-marine molluscs of Ethiopia, Wildlife of Ethiopia

References

 Non marine moll

Molluscs
Somalia
Somalia